The Hebrides is a concert overture that was composed by Felix Mendelssohn in 1830, revised in 1832, and published the next year as Mendelssohn's Op. 26. Some consider it an early tone poem.

It was inspired by one of Mendelssohn's trips to the British Isles, specifically an 1829 excursion to the Scottish island of Staffa, with its basalt sea cave known as Fingal's Cave. It was reported that the composer immediately jotted down the opening theme for his composition after seeing the island. He at first called the work To the Lonely Island or Zur einsamen Insel, but then settled on the present title. However, in 1834, the year after the first publication, Breitkopf & Härtel issued an edition with the name Fingalshöhle (Fingal's Cave) and this title stuck, causing some confusion.

Being a concert overture, The Hebrides does not precede a play or opera, but is instead a standalone composition in a form common for the Romantic period. Dedicated to Frederick William IV of Prussia, then Crown Prince of Prussia, the B minor work became part of the standard orchestral repertoire and retains this position to the present day.

As an indication of the esteem in which it is held by musicians, Johannes Brahms once said "I would gladly give all I have written, to have composed something like the Hebrides Overture".

Background
Mendelssohn's first visited England in 1829 following invitations from Sir George Smart and the Philharmonic Society. Following his tour of England, Mendelssohn proceeded to Scotland, where he began work on his Symphony No. 3, Scottish. He was engaged on a tour of Scotland with his travelling companion Karl Klingemann when he sent a letter to his family with the opening phrase of the overture written on it. In a note to his sister Fanny, he said: "In order to make you understand how extraordinarily the Hebrides affected me, I send you the following, which came into my head there."

The work was completed on 16 December 1830 and was originally entitled Die einsame Insel (The Lonely Island). However, Mendelssohn later revised the score and renamed the piece Die Hebriden (The Hebrides). Despite this, the title of Fingal's Cave was also used: on the orchestral parts he labelled the music The Hebrides, but on the score Mendelssohn labelled the music Fingal's Cave. This revision of the overture was premiered on 14 May 1832 in London in a concert conducted by Thomas Attwood, that also featured Mendelssohn's Overture to A Midsummer Night's Dream. The final revision was completed by 20 June 1832. and premiered on 10 January 1833 in Berlin under the composer's own baton.

Description

The music, though labelled as an overture, is intended to stand as a complete work. Although programme music, it does not tell a specific story and is not "about" anything; instead, the piece depicts a mood and "sets a scene", making it an early example of such musical tone poems. The overture consists of two primary themes; the opening notes of the overture state the theme Mendelssohn wrote while visiting the cave, and is played initially by the violas, cellos, and bassoons. This lyrical theme, suggestive of the power and stunning beauty of the cave, is intended to develop feelings of loneliness and solitude. The second theme, meanwhile, depicts movement at sea and "rolling waves".

The piece is scored for 2 flutes, 2 oboes, 2 clarinets, 2 bassoons, 2 horns, 2 trumpets, timpani and strings.

Performances of the overture typically last between 10½ and 11 minutes. The autograph manuscript of the work is held in the Bodleian Library, Oxford.

In popular culture
 The overture can be heard in Luis Buñuel's film L'Age d'Or (1930).
 The full work provides the soundtrack for the 1941 experimental film Moods of the Sea by Slavko Vorkapić and John Hoffman.
 An extract was used for the inscrutable and seemingly indestructible hopping mynah bird in the brief Warner Bros. 1940s cartoon series "Inki and the Minah Bird".
 An a cappella arrangement can be heard in Crash Twinsanity.
 Heard in the 1943 film The Life and Death of Colonel Blimp by Michael Powell.
 The overture is used in a 1949 CSIRO video "Division of radiophysics" . 
 Can be heard in the 1954 Warner Bros. Looney Tunes animated cartoon short From A to Z-Z-Z-Z.
 The opening 2 minutes of the piece featured in the PlayStation video game Colony Wars: Vengeance during selected cutscenes.
 The passages after the second theme, leading to the end of the exposition, were used for great dramatic effect on the “Lone Ranger” radio broadcasts.

See also
 Mendelssohn on Mull Festival

References

External links
 

Compositions by Felix Mendelssohn
1830 compositions
Concert overtures
Hebrides
1830 in Scotland
Compositions in B minor